Canada has implemented the "R-2000" in 1982 to promote better than building code construction to increase energy efficiency and promote sustainability. An optional feature of the R-2000 home program is the EnerGuide rating service. This service is available across Canada, allows home builders and home buyers to measure and rate the performance of their homes, and confirm that those specifications have been met. Some Canadian provinces are considering mandatory use of the service for all new homes.

Regional initiatives based on R-2000 include Energy Star for New Homes, Built Green, Novoclimat, GreenHome, Power Smart for New Homes, and GreenHouse.

The Building Owners and Managers Association manages the BOMA BESt (Building Environment Standards) certification, replacing their Go Green and Go Green Plus programs.

Established in December 2002, the Canada Green Building Council obtained an exclusive licence in July 2003 from the United States Green Building Council to adapt the LEED rating system to Canadian circumstances. The path for LEED's entry to Canada had already been prepared by BREEAM-Canada, an environmental performance assessment standard released by the Canadian Standards Association in June 1996. The American authors of LEED-NC 1.0 had borrowed heavily from BREEAM-Canada in the outline of their rating system; and in the assignment of credits for performance criteria. The Canadian LEED for Homes rating system was released on March 3, 2009.

In March 2006, Canada's first green building point of service, Light House Sustainable Building Centre, opened on Granville Island in the heart of Vancouver, BC. A destination for the public and professionals alike, the Light House resource centre is funded by Canadian government departments and businesses to help implement green building practices and to recognize the economic value of green building as a new regional economy.

Notable green buildings
 VanDusen Botanical Garden Visitor Centre
 Beamish-Munro Hall at Queen's University features sustainable construction methods such as high fly-ash concrete, triple-glazed windows, dimmable fluorescent lights and a grid-tied photovoltaic array.
 Gene H. Kruger Pavilion at Laval University uses largely nonpolluting, nontoxic, recycled and renewable materials as well as advanced bioclimatic concepts that reduce energy consumption by 25% compared with a concrete building of the same dimensions. The structure of the building is made entirely out of wood products, thus further reducing the environmental impact of the building.
 The Greenstone Building, which houses federal government offices in Yellowknife, capital of the Northwest Territories, became the first LEED Gold certified building in Northern Canada in 2007.
 The City of Calgary Water Centre officially opened June 4, 2008 at the Manchester Centre with a minimum Green Building Council of Canada’s Gold LEED (Leadership in Energy and Environmental Design) level certification. The  office building is 95 per cent day lit, conserves energy and water and fosters a productive, healthy environment for visitors and employees alike.
 Rodeo Fine Homes development in Newmarket, Ontario is first in Canada to be built entirely to LEED platinum eco-standard. The 34 homes in the EcoLogic development by Rodeo Fine Homes will use at least 50 per cent less water, have 35 per cent fewer discharge flows and generate 60 per cent less solid waste, greenhouse gas production and energy consumption than conventional homes. Local suppliers are featured, such as Forest Stewardship Council certified lumber from Kott Lumber in Stouffville and Mississauga cabinet manufacturer Aya produced the urea formaldehyde-free EVO cabinetry.

See also
Energy in Canada
Green building
Building Green Edmonton Home Builders

References